The Lady in Black (German:Die Dame in Schwarz) is a 1920 German silent crime film directed by Victor Janson and starring Curt Goetz, Hugo Falke and Willy Kaiser-Heyl. It features the popular detective hero Joe Deebs.

The film's sets were designed by the art director Kurt Richter.

Cast
 Curt Goetz as Joe Deebs, Detektiv 
 Hugo Falke as Graf von Falkenhorst  
 Willy Kaiser-Heyl as Pastor Jürgens  
 Max Kronert as Deebs Diener  
 Josef Rehberger as Graf Falkenhorsts indischer Diener  
 Magnus Stifter as Gutsbesitzer Rittmeister Vallentin  
 Gertrude Welcker as Gräfin Katja von Falkenhorst

References

Bibliography
 Bock, Hans-Michael & Bergfelder, Tim. The Concise CineGraph. Encyclopedia of German Cinema. Berghahn Books, 2009.

External links

1920 films
1920 crime films
German crime films
Films of the Weimar Republic
German silent feature films
Films directed by Victor Janson
UFA GmbH films
German black-and-white films
1920s German films